Serafino Brizzi (1684–1737) was an Italian engraver of the Baroque period, active in Bologna. He is believed to have trained with Ferdinando Galli-Bibiena. He is also called Briccio or Brizio

References

Italian engravers
Baroque engravers
1684 births
1724 deaths